A free-trade zone (FTZ) is a class of special economic zone. It is a geographic area where goods may be imported, stored, handled, manufactured, or reconfigured and re-exported under specific customs regulation and generally not subject to customs duty. Free trade zones are generally organized around major seaports, international airports, and national frontiers—areas with many geographic advantages for trade.

Definition
The World Bank defines free trade zones as "small, fenced-in, duty-free areas, offering warehousing, storage, and distribution facilities for trade, transshipment, and re-export operations". Free-trade zones can also be defined as labor-intensive manufacturing centers that involve the import of raw materials or components and the export of factory products, but this is a dated definition as more and more free-trade zones focus on service industries such as software, back-office operations, research, and financial services.

Synonyms
Free-trade zones are referred to as "foreign-trade zones" in the United States (Foreign Trade Zones Act of 1934), where FTZs provide customs-related advantages as well as exemptions from state and local inventory taxes. In other countries, they have been called "duty-free export processing zones," "export-free zones," "export processing zones," "free export zones," "free zones," "industrial free zones," "investment promotion zones," "maquiladoras," and "special economic zones". Some were previously called "free ports". Free zones range from specific-purpose manufacturing facilities to areas where legal systems and economic regulation vary from the normal provisions of the country concerned. Free zones may reduce taxes, customs duties, and regulatory requirements for registration of business. Zones around the world often provide special exemptions from normal immigration procedures and foreign investment restrictions as well as other features. Free zones are intended to foster economic activity and employment that could occur elsewhere.

Export-processing zone
An export-processing zone (EPZ) is a specific type of FTZ usually set up in developing countries by their governments to promote industrial and commercial exports. According to the World Bank, "an export processing zone is an industrial estate, usually a fenced-in area of 10 to 300 hectares, that specializes in manufacturing for export. It offers firms free trade conditions and a liberal regulatory environment. Its objectives are to attract foreign investors, collaborators, and buyers who can facilitate entry into the world market for some of the economy's industrial goods, thus generating employment and foreign exchange". Most FTZs are located in developing countries; Brazil, Colombia, India, Indonesia, El Salvador, China, the Philippines, Malaysia, Bangladesh, Nigeria, Pakistan, Mexico, the Dominican Republic, Costa Rica, Honduras, Guatemala, Kenya, Sri Lanka, Mauritius, and Madagascar all have EPZ programs. In 1997, 93 countries had set up export processing zones, employing 22.5 million people, and five years later, in 2003, EPZs in 116 countries employed 43 million people.

Brazil 
In Brazil, 25 Export-Processing Zones have been authorized in 17 states, and 19 of them have been implemented. Brazilian government launched the first Export processing zones in 1988, aiming to fight the unbalances in the country. First EPZ area in operation was located near of the Port of Pecém in Ceará. Companies in these areas are benefited from tax exemptions and incentives at the ICMS Tax (State Value-Added Tax). Some Brazilian states offer other regional incentives. Companies also can take advantage of a Foreign exchange treatment supported by the law that created the EPZ and proximity of Custom authorities with offices inside the EPZ.

China
China has specific rules differentiating an EPZ from a FTZ. For example, 70% of goods in EPZs must be exported, but there is no such quota for FTZs.

Background 
The world's first-documented free-trade zone was established on the Greek Island of Delos in 166 BCE. It lasted until about 69 BCE when the island was overrun by pirates.  The Romans had many  civitas libera, or free cities, some of which could coin money, establish their own laws, and not pay an annual tribute to the Roman Emperor.  These continued through at least the first millennium CE. In the 12th century, the Hanseatic League began operating in Northern Europe and established trading colonies throughout Europe.  These Free Trade Zones included Hamburg and the Steelyard in London. The Steelyard, like other Hansa stations, was a separate walled community with its own warehouses, weighing house, chapel, counting houses, and residential quarters. In 1988, remains of the former Hanseatic trading house, once the largest medieval trading complex in Britain, were uncovered by archaeologists during maintenance work on Cannon Street Station. Shannon, Ireland (Shannon Free Zone), established in 1959, has claimed to be the first "modern" free trade zone. The Shannon Zone was started to help the city airport adjust to a radical change in aircraft technology that permitted longer range aircraft to skip previously-required refueling stops in Shannon. It was an attempt by the Irish government to maintain employment around the airport so that the airport would continue to generate revenue for the Irish economy. It was hugely successful and is still in operation today. Other free zones to note are the Kandla Free Zone in India, which started in about 1960, and the Kaohsiung Export Processing Zone in Taiwan, which started in 1967. The number of worldwide free-trade zones proliferated in the late 20th century.

Corporations setting up in a zone may be given a number of regulatory and fiscal incentives, such as the right to establish a business, the right to import parts and equipment without duty, the right to keep and use foreign exchange earnings, and sometimes income or property tax breaks.  There may also be other incentives relating the methods of customs control and filing requirements.  The rationale is that the zones will attract investment, create employment, and thus reduce poverty and unemployment, stimulating the area's economy. These zones are often used by multinational corporations to set up factories to produce goods (such as clothing, shoes, and electronics).

Free-trade zones should be distinguished from free trade areas.  A free trade zone is normally established in a single country, although there are a few exceptions where a free zone may cross a national border, such as the Syrian/Jordanian Free Trade Zone. Free trade areas are set up between countries; for example, the Latin America Free Trade Association (LAFTA) was created in the 1960 Treaty of Montevideo by Argentina, Brazil, Chile, Mexico, Paraguay, Peru, and Uruguay; and the North American Free Trade Agreement was established between Mexico, the United States, and Canada.  In free trade areas, tariffs are only lowered between member countries.  They should also be distinguished from customs unions, like the former European Economic Community, where several countries agree to unify customs regulations and eliminate customs between the union members.

Free-trade zones have more recently been also called special economic zones in some countries. Special economic zones (SEZs) have been established in many countries as testing grounds for the implementation of liberal market economy principles. SEZs are viewed as instruments to enhance the acceptability and the credibility of the transformation policies and to attract domestic and foreign investment.  The change in terminology has been driven by the formation of the World Trade Organization (WTO), which prohibits members from offering certain types of fiscal incentives to promote the exports of goods, thus why the term Export Processing Zone (EPZ) is no longer used with newer zones.  For example, India converted all of its EPZs to SEZs in 2000.

In 1999, there were 43 million people working in about 3,000 FTZs spanning 116 countries and producing clothes, shoes, sneakers, electronics, and toys. The basic objectives of economic zones are to enhance foreign exchange earnings, develop export-oriented industries, and generate employment opportunities.

US Foreign-Trade Zone Board and ASF 
In the US, the Foreign Trade Zone Board is led by the Secretary of Commerce and the Secretary of the Treasury. In January 2009, the Foreign-Trade Zones Board adopted an FTZ Board staff proposal to make what it called the Alternative Site Framework (ASF) as a means of designating and managing general-purpose FTZ sites through reorganization. The ASF provides Foreign-Trade Zone grantees greater flexibility to meet specific requests for zone status by utilizing the minor boundary modification process. The theory of the ASF is that by more closely linking the amount of FTZ-designated space to the amount of space activated with Customs and Border Protection, Zone users would have better and quicker access to benefits. When an FTZ grantee evaluates whether or not to expand its FTZ project in order to improve the ease in which the Zone may be utilized by existing companies, as well as how it attracts new prospective companies, the Alternative Site Framework (ASF) should be considered. The ASF may be an appropriate option for certain Foreign-Trade Zone projects, but the decision of whether to adopt the new framework and what the configuration of the sites should be requires careful analysis and planning. Regardless of the choice to expand the FTZ project, the sites should be selected and the application drafted in such a manner as to receive swift approval while maximizing benefit to those that locate in the Zone. Successful zone projects are generally the result of a plan developed and implemented by individuals who understand all aspects of the FTZ program.

The Foreign Trade Zone Board (FTZB) approves the reorganization of Foreign Trade Zone (FTZ) 32 under the alternative site framework. The application submitted by its grantee, The Greater Miami Foreign Trade Zone was approved and officially ordered by the FTZB on January 8, 2013. From California to Oklahoma, North Carolina, and New York State, FTZs all across the nation have recently been making use of the flexible opportunities offered by the Alternative Site Framework (ASF) program. The ASF program is designed to serve zone projects that want the flexibility to both attract users/operators to certain fixed sites but also want the ability to serve companies at other locations where the demand for FTZ services will arise in the future. FTZ 32 was founded in 1979 and processes over $1 billion in goods with products from more than 65 countries and exported to more than 75 countries worldwide with speed and efficiency. According to the official order from the FTZB, FTZ 32 existing site 1, Miami Free Zone, will be classified as a magnet site.

UAE Free Zones 

Due to growing business opportunities in the United Arab Emirates (UAE), the UAE government has introduced 'Free Zones' to make it easier for foreigners to invest and operate in the UAE. In these Free Zones, investors benefit from maintaining full business ownership and receiving tax exemptions.

Some of the benefits of setting up business in UAE Free Zones are:

 No Corporate Tax, 100% exemptionprovided that business done between the free zone comapny and any mainland companies are under 375,000 AED a year.
 100% ownership of business 
 Bank accounts can be opened in a business's name
 Reasonable renewal fees
 100% import and export tax exemptions
 100% repatriation of profits and capital
 Investor VISA

Currently, there are 45 Free Trade Zones active in UAE. All these Free Trade Zones charge a license fees for operating the business and the license fees varies from freezone to freezone.

Kuwait Free Trade Zone 
Kuwait's free trade zone (FTZ) was formally launched into existence in 1999 to expand businesses and lure the export industry. The zone is located in the western part of the commercial port of Shuwaikh. It is the only free trade zone in the country. In 2019, the Council of Ministers cancelled the free-zone - leaving Kuwait without a special economic zone.

Criticism

Sometimes the domestic government pays part of the initial cost of factory setup, loosens environmental protections and rules regarding negligence and the treatment of workers, and promises not to ask payment of taxes for the next few years. When the taxation-free years are over, the corporation that set up the factory without fully assuming its costs is often able to set up operations elsewhere for less expense than the taxes to be paid, giving it leverage to take the host government to the bargaining table with more demands, but parent companies in the United States are rarely held accountable.

Political writer Naomi Klein has also criticized the transient nature of FTZs, noting the factory closures connected to the 1997 Asian financial crisis. She criticized the low wages and long hours, citing workdays of twelve or more hours in Indonesia, Philippines, Southern China, and Sri Lanka circa 2000.

See also 
Aggressive legalism
Bonded logistics park
Foreign trade zones of the United States
Free trade areas in Europe
Free economic zone
Free-trade area
Free trade
Index of international trade topics
List of free-trade zones
List of free-trade zones in Dubai
Shanghai Free-Trade Zone
Special economic zone
Factory (trading post)

References

External links
 Hualingfiz.ge Free Industrial Zone

Tax avoidance
Commercial policy
Zone